Joseph Morris was a British architect.

Family and career
Joseph was the father of Francis Edward Morris, A RIBA (1872–1908), who was articled to him in 1887 and was his professional partner 1895–1905. Joseph Morris was the Berkshire County Surveyor 1872–1905. Joseph, a Quaker, was the father of at least two daughters, Violet Morris, also an architect, and Olive Morris, wood carver and engineer, who lived for a time at the Agapemonites settlement in the Quantocks.

In 1908 Joseph was in partnership with his son Henry Silver Morris, LRIBA.

A biographical article was published by the Ancient Monuments Society, Morris of Reading: A Family of Architects 1836-1958.

Works

Royal Berkshire Hospital, Reading, Chapel, North Block
St. Paul's parish church, Highmoor, Oxfordshire, 1859
Church of the Ark of the Covenant, Stamford Hill originally the Agapemonite church, nowadays the Georgian Orthodox Cathedral of the nativity of the Lord. 1892/95
Houses, 7–25 Station Road, Reading, Berkshire, 1901–03 (with F. E. Morris)*Cordes Hall, Sunninghill, Berkshire, 1902 (with F. E. Morris)
Police Station, Rectory Road, Wokingham, Berkshire, 1904
Police Station, Broadway, Maidenhead, Berkshire, 1906

References

Sources

Architects from Berkshire
English ecclesiastical architects
1836 births
1915 deaths